This is a list of municipalities in Slovakia which have standing links to local communities in other countries known as "town twinning" (usually in Europe) or "sister cities" (usually in the rest of the world).

A
Andovce

 Nagykovácsi, Hungary
 Szákszend, Hungary

B
Bánovce nad Bebravou

 Kopřivnice, Czech Republic
 Lubliniec, Poland

Banská Bystrica

 Alba, Italy
 Ascoli Piceno, Italy
 Budva, Montenegro
 Charleston, United States
 Dabas, Hungary
 Durham, England, United Kingdom
 Halberstadt, Germany
 Herzliya, Israel
 Hradec Králové, Czech Republic
 Kovačica, Serbia
 Larissa, Greece
 Mangalia, Romania
 Montana, Bulgaria
 Radom, Poland
 Salgótarján, Hungary
 Tarnobrzeg, Poland

 Vršac, Serbia
 Zadar, Croatia

Banská Štiavnica

 Hünenberg, Switzerland
 Moravská Třebová, Czech Republic
 Olsztynek, Poland
 Ptuj, Slovenia
 Sopron, Hungary
 Tatabánya, Hungary

Bardejov

 Calais, France
 Česká Lípa, Czech Republic
 Gorlice, Poland
 Jasło, Poland
 Kaštela, Croatia
 Krynica-Zdrój, Poland
 Mikulov, Czech Republic

 Molde, Norway
 Muszyna, Poland
 Přerov, Czech Republic
 Sárospatak, Hungary

 Sremski Karlovci, Serbia

 Tiachiv, Ukraine
 Zamość, Poland

Belá-Dulice
 Poraj, Poland

Beluša
 Kistarcsa, Hungary

Blatná na Ostrove

 Mezőtúr, Hungary
 Tarany, Hungary

Bojná
 Modrá, Czech Republic

Bojnice

 Bad Krozingen, Germany
 Jeseník, Czech Republic
 La Louvière, Belgium
 Rosta, Italy
 Zator, Poland

Borský Mikuláš
 Napajedla, Czech Republic

Bratislava

 Alexandria, Egypt
 Bremen, Germany
 Brno, Czech Republic
 Cleveland, United States
 Kyiv, Ukraine
 Kraków, Poland
 Larnaca, Cyprus
 Ljubljana, Slovenia
 Perugia, Italy
 Székesfehérvár, Hungary
 Thessaloniki, Greece
 Turku, Finland
 Yerevan, Armenia

Bratislava – Devínska Nová Ves

 Omišalj, Croatia
 Preko, Croatia
 Saint-Brice-sous-Forêt, France
 Sveti Ilija, Croatia

Bratislava – Jarovce
 Benkovac, Croatia

Bratislava – Nové Mesto

 Kifissia, Greece
 Prague 7 (Prague), Czech Republic

Bratislava – Old Town

 Budavár (Bupadest), Hungary
 Innere Stadt (Vienna), Austria
 Olomouc, Czech Republic
 Prague 1 (Prague), Czech Republic

Bratislava – Petržalka
 Prague 5 (Prague), Czech Republic

Bratislava – Rača

 Gols, Austria
 Morawica, Poland
 Priverno, Italy
 Staré Město pod Landštejnem, Czech Republic

Bratislava – Ružinov

 Mtskheta, Georgia
 Tapolca, Hungary
 Umag, Croatia
 Znojmo, Czech Republic

Bratislava – Vajnory

 Alviano, Italy
 Brno-Vinohrady (Brno), Czech Republic
 Wolfsthal, Austria

Bratislava – Záhorská Bystrica

 Brumovice, Czech Republic
 Göttlesbrunn-Arbesthal, Austria
 Riese Pio X, Italy

Brezno

 Ciechanów, Poland
 Čačak, Serbia
 Meudon, France
 Nădlac, Romania
 Nový Bydžov, Czech Republic

Brezová pod Bradlom

 Břeclav, Czech Republic 
 Paulhan, France
 Pohořelice, Czech Republic 

Budmerice
 Nădlac, Romania

Bušince
 Nepomuk, Czech Republic

Bytča

 Karolinka, Czech Republic
 Opoczno, Poland

Bziny

 Boyarka, Ukraine
 Krásná, Czech Republic
 Privlaka, Croatia
 Wilkowice, Poland

C
Čachtice
 Žužemberk, Slovenia

Čadca

 Toruń, Poland
 Valašské Meziříčí, Czech Republic
 Żywiec, Poland

Chorvátsky Grob
 Benkovac, Croatia

Čierna nad Tisou
 Chop, Ukraine

Čierne
 Hrádek, Czech Republic

Čierny Balog
 Týniště nad Orlicí, Czech Republic

D
Detva
 Tuchów, Poland

Dobšiná

 Kobiór, Poland
 Rudabánya, Hungary
 Sajószentpéter, Hungary
 Šternberk, Czech Republic
 Teistungen, Germany

Doľany
 Bolatice, Czech Republic

Dolné Obdokovce
 Kerepes, Hungary

Dolný Kubín

 Eger, Hungary
 Kamianets-Podilskyi, Ukraine
 Limanowa, Poland
 Pakrac, Croatia
 Pelhřimov, Czech Republic
 Svendborg, Denmark
 Truskavets, Ukraine
 Zawiercie, Poland

Dolný Štál

 Biatorbágy, Hungary
 Győrszentiván (Győr), Hungary
 Păuleni-Ciuc, Romania
 Šupljak (Subotica), Serbia
 Tárkány, Hungary
 Velyka Dobron, Ukraine

Dubnica nad Váhom

 Otrokovice, Czech Republic
 Vác, Hungary
 Yaroslavl, Russia
 Zawadzkie, Poland

Dudince
 Kent, United States

Dunajská Streda

 Berehove, Ukraine
 Dalaman, Turkey
 Gödöllő, Hungary
 Győr, Hungary
 Jimbolia, Romania
 Jindřichův Hradec, Czech Republic
 Odorheiu Secuiesc, Romania
 Senta, Serbia
 Subotica, Serbia

Dvory nad Žitavou

 Kocsér, Hungary
 Örkény, Hungary
 Vértesszőlős, Hungary

F
Fiľakovo

 Bátonyterenye, Hungary

 Szécsény, Hungary
 Szigethalom, Hungary
 Ustrzyki Dolne, Poland

G
Gabčíkovo

 Enese, Hungary
 Kondoros, Hungary
 Mihăileni, Romania
 Nagymaros, Hungary
 Pázmándfalu, Hungary

Galanta

 Albignasego, Italy
 Bečej, Serbia
 Kecskemét, Hungary
 Liptovský Mikuláš, Slovakia
 Mikulov, Czech Republic
 Paks, Hungary
 Tótkomlós, Hungary

Gbely

 Deutsch-Wagram, Austria
 Židlochovice, Czech Republic

Gelnica

 Horní Suchá, Czech Republic
 Novodnistrovsk, Ukraine
 Le Pradet, France
 Rudnik nad Sanem, Poland

H
Hamuliakovo

 Deutsch Jahrndorf, Austria 
 Kerekegyháza, Hungary
 Rajka, Hungary

Handlová

 Konopiska, Poland
 Sárisáp, Hungary
 Voerde, Germany
 Zábřeh, Czech Republic

Hanušovce nad Topľou

 Dębica (rural gmina), Poland
 Nozdrzec, Poland
 Velká Bíteš, Czech Republic

Hlohovec

 De Panne, Belgium
 Hranice, Czech Republic
 Slovenske Konjice, Slovenia

Hnúšťa

 Dobruška, Czech Republic
 Lwówek Śląski County, Poland

Holíč

 Maloyaroslavets, Russia
 Gložan (Bački Petrovac), Serbia
 Hodonín, Czech Republic
 Hollabrunn, Austria

Horná Súča

 Slavičín, Czech Republic
 Wilamowice, Poland

Horné Srnie

 Brumov-Bylnice, Czech Republic
 Slavičín, Czech Republic

Hruštín
 Zabierzów, Poland

Humenné

 Darney, France
 Jarosław, Poland
 Mátészalka, Hungary
 Mukachevo, Ukraine
 Perechyn, Ukraine
 Przemyśl, Poland
 Sanok, Poland
 Šibenik, Croatia
 Třebíč, Czech Republic
 Vidnoye, Russia

Hurbanovo

 Lovran, Croatia
 Pápa, Hungary
 Žlutice, Czech Republic

I
Ilava

 Klimkovice, Czech Republic
 Mikołów, Poland

Ivanka pri Dunaji
 Pozořice, Czech Republic

J
Jasov

 Bélapátfalva, Hungary
 Nyírmada, Hungary
 Sântimbru, Romania
 Tura, Hungary

Jelšava

 Nădlac, Romania
 Szczekociny, Poland
 Tótkomlós, Hungary
 Uničov, Czech Republic

K
Kálnica
 Popovice, Czech Republic

Kamenec pod Vtáčnikom

 Dolní Bečva, Czech Republic
 Neureichenau, Germany
 Postřelmov, Czech Republic

Kanianka

 Fryšták, Czech Republic
 Ruda nad Moravou, Czech Republic

Kechnec
 Isaszeg, Hungary

Keť

 Diósd, Hungary
 Hosszúpereszteg, Hungary
 Kéty, Hungary
 Kęty, Poland
 Lázi, Hungary

Kežmarok

 Bochnia, Poland
 Gliwice, Poland
 Hajdúszoboszló, Hungary
 Kupiškis, Lithuania
 Lanškroun, Czech Republic
 Lesneven, France
 Nowy Targ, Poland
 Příbram, Czech Republic
 Weilburg, Germany
 Zgierz, Poland

Kolárovo

 Galgaguta, Hungary
 Kisbér, Hungary
 Medgyesegyháza, Hungary
 Mezőberény, Hungary
 Pitvaros, Hungary

Komárno

 Blansko, Czech Republic
 Komárom, Hungary
 Kralupy nad Vltavou, Czech Republic
 Lieto, Finland
 Sebeş, Romania
 Terezín, Czech Republic
 Weißenfels, Germany

Košeca
 Štítná nad Vláří-Popov, Czech Republic

Košice

 Abaújszántó, Hungary
 Bursa, Turkey
 Cottbus, Germany
 Katowice, Poland
 Krosno, Poland
 Miskolc, Hungary
 Mobile, United States
 Niš, Serbia
 Ostrava, Czech Republic
 Plovdiv, Bulgaria
 Raahe, Finland
 Rzeszów, Poland
 Saint Petersburg, Russia
 Uzhorod, Ukraine
 Vysoké Tatry, Slovakia

 Wuppertal, Germany

Kováčová
 Volyně, Czech Republic

Kráľovský Chlmec

 Berehove, Ukraine
 Felsőzsolca, Hungary
  Ferencváros (Budapest), Hungary
 Kanjiža, Serbia
 Kisvárda, Hungary
 Rakovník, Czech Republic
 Sfântu Gheorghe, Romania

Krasňany

 Castello Tesino, Italy
 Strumień, Poland

Krásno nad Kysucou

 Frenštát pod Radhoštěm, Czech Republic
 Metylovice, Czech Republic

Krásnohorská Dlhá Lúka

 Ibrány, Hungary
 Ragály, Hungary
 Zubogy, Hungary

Kremnica

 Fidenza, Italy
 Herbolzheim, Germany
 Kutná Hora, Czech Republic
 Nový Jičín, Czech Republic
 Várpalota, Hungary

Krompachy

 Békéscsaba, Hungary 
 Gaszowice, Poland 
 Nădlac, Romania
 Ozimek, Poland
 Rýmařov, Czech Republic

Krupina

 Anykščiai, Lithuania
 Krapinske Toplice, Croatia
 Nepomuk, Czech Republic

Kuchyňa
 Podolí, Czech Republic

Kunerad
 Wilamowice, Poland

Kysucké Nové Mesto

 Gogolin, Poland
 Jablunkov, Czech Republic
 Łodygowice, Poland
 Rive-de-Gier, France

L
Ladce
 Kelč, Czech Republic

Lazany
 Úsov, Czech Republic

Lehota pod Vtáčnikom
 Bludov, Czech Republic

Lendak
 Konstantynów Łódzki, Poland

Leopoldov
 Fertőszentmiklós, Hungary

Levice

 Boskovice, Czech Republic
 Érd, Hungary
 Lubaczów, Poland
 Náměšť na Hané, Czech Republic
 Ruda Śląska, Poland
 Skierniewice, Poland

Levoča

 Kalwaria Zebrzydowska, Poland
 Keszthely, Hungary
 Łańcut, Poland
 Litomyšl, Czech Republic
 Stary Sącz, Poland

Likavka

 Popești, Romania
 Slatiňany, Czech Republic
 Wilkowice, Poland

Lipany

 Bílovec, Czech Republic
 Khust, Ukraine

Liptovská Teplička
 Dolní Čermná, Czech Republic

Liptovské Revúce
 Chlebičov, Czech Republic

Liptovský Hrádok

 Česká Skalice, Czech Republic
 Hradec nad Moravicí, Czech Republic
 Nowy Targ (rural gmina), Poland
 Stary Sącz, Poland

Liptovský Mikuláš

 Annecy, France
 Bačka Palanka, Serbia
 Galanta, Slovakia
 Kalamaria, Greece
 Kemi, Finland
 Kiskőrös, Hungary
 Michalovce, Slovakia
 Opava, Czech Republic
 Terchová, Slovakia
 Żywiec, Poland

Lisková

 Kravaře, Czech Republic
 Woźniki, Poland

Lučenec

 Louny, Czech Republic
 Mělník, Czech Republic
 Pápa, Hungary
 Polesella, Italy
 Salgótarján, Hungary
 Zolotonosha, Ukraine

M
Malacky

 Albertirsa, Hungary
 Gänserndorf, Austria
 Szarvas, Hungary
 Veselí nad Moravou, Czech Republic
 Żnin, Poland

Malinovo

 Csókakő, Hungary
 Hédervár, Hungary
 Idrifaia (Suplac), Romania

Martin

 Bački Petrovac, Serbia
 Balashikha, Russia 
 Békéscsaba, Hungary
 Fargo, United States
 Gotha, Germany
 Hoogeveen, Netherlands
 Jičín, Czech Republic
 Kalisz, Poland

Medzev is a member of the Charter of European Rural Communities, a town twinning association across the European Union. Medzev also has several other twin towns.

Charter of European Rural Communities
 Bienvenida, Spain
 Bièvre, Belgium
 Bucine, Italy
 Cashel, Ireland
 Cissé, France
 Desborough, England, United Kingdom
 Esch (Haaren), Netherlands
 Hepstedt, Germany
 Ibănești, Romania
 Kandava (Tukums), Latvia
 Kannus, Finland
 Kolindros, Greece
 Lassee, Austria
 Moravče, Slovenia
 Næstved, Denmark
 Nagycenk, Hungary
 Nadur, Malta
 Ockelbo, Sweden
 Pano Lefkara, Cyprus
 Põlva, Estonia
 Samuel (Soure), Portugal
 Slivo Pole, Bulgaria
 Starý Poddvorov, Czech Republic
 Strzyżów, Poland
 Tisno, Croatia
 Troisvierges, Luxembourg
 Žagarė (Joniškis), Lithuania
Other
 Castel Giorgio, Italy
 Holice, Czech Republic
 Miroslav, Czech Republic
 Rátka, Hungary

Medzilaborce

 Kozienice, Poland
 Náměšť nad Oslavou, Czech Republic

Michalovce

 Cognac, France 
 Jarosław, Poland
 Kavarna, Bulgaria
 Liptovský Mikuláš, Slovakia
 Pančevo, Serbia

 Uzhorod, Ukraine
 Villarreal, Spain
 Vyškov, Czech Republic

Modra

 Benátky nad Jizerou, Czech Republic
 Hustopeče, Czech Republic
 Overijse, Belgium

Modra nad Cirochou

 Czarna, Poland
 Modrá, Czech Republic

Modrany

 Acățari, Romania
 Isztimér, Hungary
 Kocs, Hungary
 Sükösd, Hungary

Modrý Kameň
 Bercel, Hungary

Moldava nad Bodvou

 Brzozów, Poland
 Cristuru Secuiesc, Romania
 Edelény, Hungary
 Encs, Hungary
 Karcag, Hungary
 Pestszentlőrinc-Pestszentimre (Budapest), Hungary
 Siklós, Hungary
 Tarcal, Hungary
 Tišnov, Czech Republic

Mošovce

 Dwikozy, Poland
 Kozy, Poland
 Lalić (Odžaci), Serbia

Mostová

 Bábolna, Hungary
 Bikal, Hungary
 Erdőkürt, Hungary
 Hejőkürt, Hungary
 Ojdula, Romania
 Tiszakürt, Hungary

Muráň
 Fryšták, Czech Republic

Myjava

 Åsnes, Norway
 Dolní Němčí, Czech Republic
 Janošik (Alibunar), Serbia
 Little Falls, United States
 Kostelec nad Orlicí, Czech Republic

N
Námestovo

 Humpolec, Czech Republic
 Myszków, Poland
 Orlová, Czech Republic

Nemšová
 Hluk, Czech Republic

Nenince

 Baktalórántháza, Hungary
 Ciumani, Romania
 Dány, Hungary
 Ráckeve, Hungary

Nesvady

 Felsőszentiván, Hungary
 Kiskőrös, Hungary
 Nagyigmánd, Hungary

Nitra

 Bački Petrovac, Serbia
 České Budějovice, Czech Republic

 Gyeongju, South Korea
 Kroměříž, Czech Republic
 Naperville, United States
 Osijek, Croatia
 Spišská Nová Ves, Slovakia
 Veszprém, Hungary
 Zielona Góra, Poland
 Zoetermeer, Netherlands

Nitrianske Pravno
 Hanušovice, Czech Republic

Nitrianske Sučany
 Bohdíkov, Czech Republic 

Nižná

 Horní Suchá, Czech Republic
 Mszana Dolna, Poland

Nižný Hrušov

 Hatvan, Hungary
 Iwonicz-Zdrój, Poland
 Lesné, Slovakia
 Skołyszyn, Poland

Nová Baňa

 Mimoň, Czech Republic
 Nin, Croatia

Nová Bošáca
 Košíky, Czech Republic

Nová Bystrica

 Josipovac (Osijek), Croatia
 Řeka, Czech Republic

Nová Dubnica

 Červený Kameň, Slovakia
 Cheb, Czech Republic
 Dubna, Russia
 Pruské, Slovakia
 Slavičín, Czech Republic

Nová Ľubovňa
 Zašová, Czech Republic

Nováky

 Jílové u Prahy, Czech Republic
 Oslavany, Czech Republic

Nové Mesto nad Váhom
 Uherský Brod, Czech Republic

Nové Zámky

 Fonyód, Hungary
 Sevnica, Slovenia
 Tábor, Czech Republic
 Znojmo, Czech Republic

O
Ochodnica

 Dobrá, Czech Republic
 Mucharz, Poland

Oravský Podzámok 

 Lipinki, Poland
 Vodňany, Czech Republic
 Włodowice, Poland

Oščadnica
 Lipowa, Poland

Ostrý Grúň

 Kandanos, Greece
 Napajedla, Czech Republic

P
Palárikovo
 Zubří, Czech Republic

Papradno
 Karolinka, Czech Republic

Partizánske

 Bajina Bašta, Serbia
 Benešov, Czech Republic
 Krapkowice, Poland
 Náchod, Czech Republic
 Svit, Slovakia
 Valašské Meziříčí, Czech Republic
 Vukovar, Croatia

Pezinok

 Izola, Slovenia
 Mladá Boleslav, Czech Republic
 Mosonmagyaróvár, Hungary
 Neusiedl am See, Austria

Piešťany

 Eilat, Israel
 Hajdúnánás, Hungary
 Heinola, Finland
 Luhačovice, Czech Republic
 Poděbrady, Czech Republic

 Ustroń, Poland
 Varaždinske Toplice, Croatia

Plešivec

 Alsózsolca, Hungary
 Matei, Romania

Podolínec
 Rytro, Poland

Poprad

 Szarvas, Hungary
 Ústí nad Orlicí, Czech Republic
 Vysoké Tatry, Slovakia
 Zakopane, Poland

Považská Bystrica

 Bačka Palanka, Serbia
 Bełchatów, Poland
 Gjorče Petrov (Skopje), North Macedonia
 Holešov, Czech Republic
 Rožnov pod Radhoštěm, Czech Republic
 Sovetsk, Russia
 Tauragė, Lithuania
 Zhodzina, Belarus
 Zubří, Czech Republic

Prešov

 Gabrovo, Bulgaria
 Keratsini, Greece
 Mukachevo, Ukraine
 Nowy Sącz, Poland
 Nyíregyháza, Hungary
 Pittsburgh, United States
 Prague 10 (Prague), Czech Republic
 Remscheid, Germany
 Rishon LeZion, Israel

Pribylina
 Ropice, Czech Republic

Prievidza

 Ibbenbüren, Germany
 Jastrzębie-Zdrój, Poland
 Luserna San Giovanni, Italy
 Šumperk, Czech Republic
 Valjevo, Serbia
 Velenje, Slovenia

Púchov

 Babruysk, Belarus
 Bila Tserkva, Ukraine
 Hlinsko, Czech Republic
 Omsk, Russia
 Stara Pazova, Serbia

Pukanec
 Nădlac, Romania

R
Radzovce

 Seč, Czech Republic
 Varsány, Hungary

Rajec

 Czechowice-Dziedzice, Poland
 Kęty, Poland
 Krnov, Czech Republic
 Rýmařov, Czech Republic

Rajecké Teplice

 Dolní Benešov, Czech Republic
 Padina (Kovačica), Serbia
 Pozlovice, Czech Republic
 Wilamowice, Poland

Raková 

 Lipowa, Poland
 Stará Ves nad Ondřejnicí, Czech Republic

Raslavice

 Călărași, Moldova
 Călărași, Romania
 Copceac, Moldova
 Dydnia, Poland
 Korzenna, Poland
 Radslavice, Czech Republic

Rejdová

 Kovačica, Serbia
 Sajóbábony, Hungary

Revúca

 Kazincbarcika, Hungary
 Lędziny, Poland

 Litovel, Czech Republic
 Pakrac, Croatia
 Selca, Croatia

Rimavská Sobota

 Kolín, Czech Republic
 Ózd, Hungary
 Salonta, Romania
 Świętochłowice, Poland
 Tiszaújváros, Hungary

Rohožník

 Kašava, Czech Republic
 Rogoźnik (Gmina Nowy Targ), Poland

Rožňava

 Bačka Topola, Serbia
 Belváros-Lipótváros (Budapest), Hungary
 Český Těšín, Czech Republic
 Cieszyn, Poland
 Szerencs, Hungary

Ružomberok

 Bački Petrovac, Serbia
 Děčín, Czech Republic
 Gospić, Croatia
 Hlučín, Czech Republic
 Kroměříž, Czech Republic
 Prague 6 (Prague), Czech Republic

S
Sabinov

 Çubuk, Turkey
 Kenderes, Hungary
 Siedlce, Poland
 Soběslav, Czech Republic

Šahy

 Héhalom, Hungary
 Vác, Hungary
 Veresegyház, Hungary

Šaľa

 Końskie, Poland
 Kuhmo, Finland
 Mohyliv-Podilskyi, Ukraine
 Oroszlány, Hungary
 Telč, Czech Republic

Šamorín

 Gheorgheni, Romania
 Hainburg an der Donau, Austria
 Mosonmagyaróvár, Hungary

Šaštín-Stráže

 Bełżyce, Poland
 Brody, Ukraine
 Moravské Budějovice, Czech Republic

Semerovo

 Nisko, Poland
 Šatov, Czech Republic

Senec

 Ialoveni, Moldova
 Kőszeg, Hungary
 Mosonmagyaróvár, Hungary
 Parndorf, Austria
 Senj, Croatia

Senica

 Bač, Serbia
 Herzogenbuchsee, Switzerland
 Pułtusk, Poland
 Santa Tecla, El Salvador
 Trutnov, Czech Republic
 Velké Pavlovice, Czech Republic

Šenkvice

 Hrvatska Kostajnica, Croatia
 Velké Bílovice, Czech Republic

Sereď
 Tišnov, Czech Republic

Skalica

 Arcueil, France
 Freyburg, Germany

 Hodonín, Czech Republic
 Schwechat, Austria
 Slaný, Czech Republic
 Strážnice, Czech Republic
 Uherské Hradiště, Czech Republic

Sládkovičovo

 Csorvás, Hungary
 Diosig, Romania
 Ivančice, Czech Republic

Slepčany
 Letovice, Czech Republic

Sliač
 Přibyslav, Czech Republic

Smižany

 Borsodnádasd, Hungary
 Kamienica, Poland
 Komorniki, Poland

Snina

 Boguchwała, Poland
 Khust, Ukraine

 Lesko, Poland
 Prague 4 (Prague), Czech Republic
 Seferihisar, Turkey

 Žarošice, Czech Republic

Sobrance

 Cigánd, Hungary
 Lubaczów, Poland
 Perechyn, Ukraine

Spišská Belá

 Vysoké Mýto, Czech Republic
 Brück, Germany
 Ożarów, Poland
 Szczawnica, Poland

Spišská Nová Ves

 L'Aigle, France
 Alsfeld, Germany
 Clausthal-Zellerfeld, Germany
 Grójec, Poland
 Havlíčkův Brod, Czech Republic
 Joinville, Brazil
 Kisújszállás, Hungary
 Myślenice, Poland
 Nitra, Slovakia
 Preveza, Greece
 Tiachiv, Ukraine
 Tongzhou (Beijing), China
 Youngstown, United States

Spišské Podhradie

 Głogów Małopolski, Poland
 Ogrodzieniec, Poland
 Perechyn, Ukraine
 Pinetop-Lakeside, United States
 Show Low, United States
 Vrbové, Slovakia

Stakčín

 Lutowiska, Poland
 Slavonice, Czech Republic

Stará Bystrica

 Gorzyce, Poland
 Řeka, Czech Republic

Stará Ľubovňa

 Aleșd, Romania
 Bački Petrovac, Serbia
 Balchik, Bulgaria
 Biograd na Moru, Croatia
 North Augusta, United States
 Nowy Sącz, Poland
 Połaniec, Poland
 Svaliava, Ukraine
 Vsetín, Czech Republic

Stará Turá
 Kunovice, Czech Republic

Strážske

 Dolna Banya, Bulgaria
 Drahanská vrchovina (microregion), Czech Republic
 Nieporęt, Poland

Stropkov

 Biłgoraj, Poland
 Bílina, Czech Republic
 Korczyna, Poland
 Palamuse (Jõgeva Parish), Estonia
 Ropczyce, Poland

Stupava

 Ivančice, Czech Republic
 Kuřim, Czech Republic
 Łowicz, Poland
 Nagykovácsi, Hungary
 Svoge, Bulgaria

Štúrovo

 Baraolt, Romania
 Bruntál, Czech Republic
 Castellarano, Italy
 Esztergom, Hungary
 Kłobuck, Poland
 Kőbánya (Budapest), Hungary
 Novi Bečej, Serbia

Štvrtok na Ostrove

 Balatonederics, Hungary
 Cozmeni, Romania
 Gyömrő, Hungary
 Máriakálnok, Hungary

Sučany
 Fulnek, Czech Republic 

Svätý Jur
 Bělá pod Bezdězem, Czech Republic

Svidník

 Chrudim, Czech Republic
 Jarosław, Poland
 Kriva Palanka, North Macedonia
 Rakhiv, Ukraine
 Sanok County, Poland
 Strzyżów, Poland
 Świdnik, Poland
 Vrbas, Serbia

Svit

 Česká Třebová, Czech Republic
 Knurów, Poland
 Partizánske, Slovakia
 San Lorenzo in Campo, Italy

Svodín

 Bystřice, Czech Republic
 Pińczów, Poland
 Tata, Hungary

T
Tekovské Lužany

 Bátaszék, Hungary
 Kondoros, Hungary

Teplička nad Váhom

 Moravský Beroun, Czech Republic 
 Pawłowice, Poland

Tisovec

 Ludgeřovice, Czech Republic 
 Nowy Żmigród, Poland
 Putnok, Hungary
 Shenandoah, United States
 Tăuții-Măgherăuș, Romania

Topoľčany

 Artern, Germany 
 Jászberény, Hungary
 Luhačovice, Czech Republic
 Mazingarbe, France
 Prilep, North Macedonia
 Rybnik, Poland

Topoľčianky
 Holešov, Czech Republic

Topoľníky

 Kóny, Hungary
 Milówka, Poland

Tornaľa

 Heves, Hungary
 Putnok, Hungary
 Tarnów (rural gmina), Poland
 Valea lui Mihai, Romania

Trebišov

 Hodonín, Czech Republic
 Jasło, Poland

Trenčianska Teplá

 Jastrebarsko, Croatia
 Uherský Ostroh, Czech Republic

Trenčianska Turná
 Bojkovice, Czech Republic

Trenčianske Teplice

 Aschersleben, Germany 
 Tuzla, Turkey
 Vsetín, Czech Republic 
 Wilamowice, Poland

Trenčín

 Békéscsaba, Hungary
 Casalecchio di Reno, Italy
 Cran-Gevrier (Annecy), France
 Kragujevac, Serbia
 Tarnów, Poland

 Zlín, Czech Republic

Trnava

 Balakovo, Russia
 Břeclav, Czech Republic
 Casale Monferrato, Italy
 Chomutov, Czech Republic
 Kharkiv, Ukraine
 Novo Mesto, Slovenia
 Sangerhausen, Germany
 Szombathely, Hungary
 Varaždin, Croatia
 Zabrze, Poland

Trnávka
 Tárnok, Hungary

Trstená

 Hořice, Czech Republic
 Isaszeg, Hungary
 Jabłonka, Poland
 Ozorków, Poland
 Želiezovce, Slovakia
 Žirovnice, Czech Republic

Trstice

 Dunaszeg, Hungary
 Inárcs, Hungary
 Újbuda (Budapest), Hungary

Turčianske Teplice

 Aranđelovac, Serbia
 Holešov, Czech Republic
 Havířov, Czech Republic
 Skawina, Poland
 Wisła, Poland  

Turzovka

 Frýdlant nad Ostravicí, Czech Republic

 Kęty, Poland

Tvrdošín

 Durbuy, Belgium
 Kobylnica, Poland
 Kościelisko, Poland
 Orimattila, Finland
 Östhammar, Sweden
 Valga, Estonia
 Valka, Latvia

Tvrdošovce

 Bonyhád, Hungary
 Környe, Hungary
 Nagyatád, Hungary
 Piliscsév, Hungary
 Szákszend, Hungary
 Tardos, Hungary
 Zetea, Romania

U
Uhrovec

 Gilowice, Poland
 Kiskunfélegyháza, Hungary
 Modrá, Czech Republic
 Slavičín, Czech Republic

V
Valaliky

 Košťany, Czech Republic
 Košťany nad Turcom, Slovakia

Valaská 
 Chlumec nad Cidlinou, Czech Republic

Veľká Lomnica
 Lomnice, Czech Republic

Veľké Kapušany
 Vásárosnamény, Hungary

Veľký Krtíš

 Aleksin, Russia
 Písek, Czech Republic

Veľký Meder

 Bácsalmás, Hungary
 Dobruška, Czech Republic
 Tápiógyörgye, Hungary

Veľký Šariš

 Grybów, Poland
 Nyírtelek, Hungary
 Rakoshino, Ukraine

Vráble

 Andouillé, France
 Csurgó, Hungary  
 Nova Varoš, Serbia

Vranov nad Topľou

 Boguchwała, Poland 
 Bystřice nad Pernštejnem, Czech Republic
 Dynów, Poland 
 Mád, Hungary
 Vynohradiv, Ukraine

Vrbové

 Spišské Podhradie, Slovakia
 Vítkov, Czech Republic

Vrútky

 Bebra, Germany
 Fulnek, Czech Republic
 Łaziska Górne, Poland
 Nymburk, Czech Republic

Vysoká nad Kysucou
 Karolinka, Czech Republic

Vysoké Tatry

 Bukowina Tatrzańska, Poland
 Košice, Slovakia

 Nosegawa, Japan
 Pardubice, Czech Republic
 Poprad, Slovakia
 Prostějov, Czech Republic
 Zakopane, Poland

Z
Zábiedovo
 Dobratice, Czech Republic

Zatín

 Cârța, Romania
 Helvécia, Hungary
 Yanoshi, Ukraine

Želiezovce

 Barcs, Hungary
 Makó, Hungary
 Miercurea Ciuc, Romania
 Trstená, Slovakia

Žiar nad Hronom
 Svitavy, Czech Republic

Žilina

 Bielsko-Biała, Poland
 Changchun, China
 Dnipro, Ukraine
 Essen, Belgium
 Frýdek-Místek, Czech Republic
 Kikinda, Serbia
 Nanterre, France
 Plzeň, Czech Republic
 Prague 15 (Prague), Czech Republic
 Třinec, Czech Republic

Žirany

 Dorog, Hungary
 Papkeszi, Hungary

Žitavany
 Morkovice-Slížany, Czech Republic

Zlaté Moravce

 Bučovice, Czech Republic
 Hulín, Czech Republic
 Našice, Croatia
 Sierpc, Poland  
 Szydłów, Poland  
 Velké Přílepy, Czech Republic

Zvolen is a member of the Douzelage, a town twinning association of towns across the European Union. Zvolen also has five other twin towns.

Douzelage
 Agros, Cyprus
 Altea, Spain
 Asikkala, Finland
 Bad Kötzting, Germany
 Bellagio, Italy
 Bundoran, Ireland
 Chojna, Poland
 Granville, France
 Holstebro, Denmark
 Houffalize, Belgium
 Judenburg, Austria
 Kőszeg, Hungary
 Marsaskala, Malta
 Meerssen, Netherlands
 Niederanven, Luxembourg
 Oxelösund, Sweden
 Preveza, Greece
 Rokiškis, Lithuania
 Rovinj, Croatia
 Sesimbra, Portugal
 Sherborne, England, United Kingdom
 Sigulda, Latvia
 Siret, Romania
 Škofja Loka, Slovenia
 Sušice, Czech Republic
 Tryavna, Bulgaria
 Türi, Estonia
Other
 Imatra, Finland
 Prachatice, Czech Republic
 Rivne, Ukraine
 Tótkomlós, Hungary
 Zwoleń, Poland

References

Slovakia
Slovakia geography-related lists
Foreign relations of Slovakia
Cities and towns in Slovakia
Populated places in Slovakia